Yi Jeong (1541–1622?) was a Korean painter, one of the most popular of his time.  He was the great-great-grandson of Sejong the Great of Joseon.

References

External links
 Cleveland Museum of Art
Arts of Korea, an exhibition catalog from The Metropolitan Museum of Art Libraries (fully available online as PDF), which contains material on Yi Jeong

1541 births
1622 deaths
16th-century Korean painters
17th-century Korean painters